The 2004–05 Interliga season was the sixth season of the multi-national ice hockey league. Six teams participated in the league, and Jesenice from Slovenia have won the championship.

Regular season

Play-offs

Quarter-finals

Semi-finals

Final

Final ranking
Jesenice
Alba Volán Székesfehérvár
Slavija
Medveščak
Dunaújvárosi Acélbikák
Olimpija

External links
 Season on www.hockeyarchives.info

Interliga (1999–2007) seasons
2004–05 in European ice hockey leagues
Inter